is a series of turn-based grand strategy role-playing simulation video games. The original game was one of the first in its genre, being released in March 1983 by the Japanese video game developer Koei. Nobunaga's Ambition takes place during the Sengoku period of feudal Japan. The player is tasked with achieving the ultimate goal of warlord Oda Nobunaga: the conquest and unification of Japan. Selecting Oda Nobunaga is optional, however, as the player is also able to choose from a variety of other regional daimyōs of the time.

Games in the franchise have been released for the Nintendo Entertainment System, Game Boy, Sega Genesis, 3DO, Super Nintendo, PlayStation, Sega Saturn, PlayStation 2, PlayStation 3, Xbox 360, Wii, PlayStation Portable, PlayStation Vita, PlayStation 4 and Nintendo Switch. The title was also released for Macintosh as well as MSX, Amiga, and MS-DOS. As of March 2018, the series has shipped more than 10 million copies worldwide.

Gameplay
The player may choose from four campaign scenarios, including "Battle for the East" (beginning in 1560), "Daimyo Power Struggles" (1560), "Ambition Untamed" (1571), and "Road Towards Unification" (1582). In each scenario, the player must allocate resources to raise a capable military force, provide a productive economy to support both military and civilian expansion, and support the peasants in order to sustain their respect and loyalty. Gameplay is taken in turns, with each turn in the map view corresponding to a season, and each turn during battle corresponding to a day. The player may achieve victory through numerous means, among which are forcing the enemy to retreat, destroying the enemy command unit, outlasting an invading force, or prolonging battle until the opposing force has exhausted its supplies.

The player can make many choices during the campaign. According to Evan Brooks of Computer Gaming World: "One may transfer soldiers between fiefs, go to war, increase taxes (which causes a decrease in peasant loyalty which may lead to rebellion), transfer rice or gold to another fief, raise the level of flood control (which decreases productivity), make a non-aggression pact or arrange a marriage, cultivate (which increases productivity, but decreases peasant loyalty), use a merchant (to buy/sell rice, borrow funds, or purchase weapons), recruit for the military (soldiers or ninja), train the army (which increases fighting efficiency), spy on a rival, expand a town (which increases taxes collected, but decreases peasant loyalty), give food/rice to peasants/soldiers (to raise morale), steal peasants from rival daimyos, allocate military strength, recuperate (even a daimyo can get sick), turn over a controlled fief to the computer for administration, or pass a turn."

Games

  is the first title in the series, released March 1983. Written entirely in BASIC, it was compatible with a wide range of Japanese PCs. It has no subtitle. A remake of this game titled  was released in 1995 for Microsoft Windows 3.1, Sega Saturn, and PlayStation. An update of this for Windows 95 was released in 1996.
  is the second title in the series and the first to be released outside Japan. It was released in September 1986 for the PC-88SR, then quickly ported for various Japanese PCs. A 50-province mode covering all of Japan was added, as well as revisions to graphics and gameplay. Releases for Nintendo Entertainment System (NES), Super Nintendo Entertainment System (SNES), Sega Genesis, TurboGrafx-16, PlayStation, mobile phones, Windows, and iOS were made subsequently. The U.S. NES, Genesis and SNES releases were titled Nobunaga's Ambition; the SNES version was released for Virtual Console on April 27, 2009, for the Wii and September 4, 2014, for the Wii U in North America.
  is the third title in the series, released December 1988 for PC-88SR, then quickly ported for various Japanese PCs. Taking after the Romance of the Three Kingdoms series, this game introduces the concept of "generals" to this series. The Tōhoku and Kyūshū areas were removed. Releases for NES, PlayStation, Sega Saturn, DOS, and mobile phones were made subsequently. The U.S. Nintendo Entertainment System release was titled Nobunaga's Ambition II.
  is the fourth title in the series, released December 1990 for PC-98, then quickly ported for various Japanese PCs (this was the last title in the series supported on 8-bit PCs). The scope was once again expanded to all of Japan, and technology, culture, and tea ceremony mechanics were introduced. Releases for NES, SNES, Genesis, PlayStation, Windows, and mobile phones were made subsequently. The North American SNES release was given the subtitle of Lord of Darkness.
  is a spin-off of the series released in December 1991 for various Japanese systems and later localized for the Super NES; it is a role-playing game that uses the same setting.
  is the fifth title in the series, released December 1992 for PC-98, then quickly ported for various Japanese PCs. This is the first game with an expansion pack. Battles were changed from taking provinces to taking castles. Releases for SNES, Genesis, Sega CD, 3DO, Mac OS, PlayStation, mobile phones, and Windows were made subsequently.
  is the sixth title in the series, released December 1994 for PC-98 (the last of the series produced for DOS variants), with ports for FM Towns, DOS/V, Windows, and Macintosh available later. Commands were executed based on units of power. Releases for SNES, PlayStation, Sega Saturn, PlayStation Portable, and mobile phones were made subsequently.
  is the seventh title in the series, released March 1997 for Windows 95. This game introduces a new map, portraying the entire country on a grid. Releases for Macintosh, PlayStation, Sega Saturn, Dreamcast, PlayStation Portable, and mobile phones were made subsequently.
  is the eighth title in the series, released February 1999 for Windows 95, with ports for Macintosh, PlayStation, Dreamcast, and PlayStation Portable made later.
  is the ninth title in the series, released February 2001 for Windows 98. This game returned to province-taking battles, and the a system of varying powers was introduced. Ports for PlayStation 2, Xbox and PlayStation Portable were made later.
  is the tenth title in the series, released June 2002 for Windows 98. This game returned to castle-taking battles. It also became possible to play as a castle lord as well as a daimyō. Ports for PlayStation 2 and PlayStation Portable were made later.
  is the eleventh title in the series, released September 2003 for Windows 98. This game introduced castle towns and unified castle sieges. The administration screens transitioned to full 3D. A port for PlayStation 2 was made later; this was released in the U.S. as Nobunaga's Ambition: Rise to Power on February 5, 2008.
  is the twelfth title in the series, released June 2005 for Windows 98. The map and battles are in real-time, and the map is rendered in 3D. Ports for PlayStation 2 and Wii were made later; the former was released in the U.S. as Nobunaga's Ambition: Iron Triangle.
  is the thirteenth title in the series, released September 2009 for Windows XP, with ports for PlayStation 3, Xbox 360 and PlayStation Vita made later.
  is the fourteenth title in the series, released 12 December 2013 for PlayStation 3, PlayStation 4, and Windows. A PlayStation Vita version was released in May 2015. A western version of the game had been confirmed as of May 2015 under the title of Nobunaga's Ambition: Sphere of Influence, which was released on September 1, 2015, for North America and September 4, 2015, for Europe; It was released in PlayStation 3 as a digital release, in PlayStation 4 as a physical release, and PC via Steam. It has also been confirmed that the western release will contain both English and Japanese dub. The game is a launch game for the Nintendo Switch in Japan. A sequel titled Nobunaga's Ambition: Taishi was released on 30 November 2017.
  is the fifteenth title in the series and sequel to the 2013 game Nobunaga's Ambition: Sphere of Influence, and was released on November 30, 2017, for Microsoft Windows, PlayStation 4 and Nintendo Switch.

  is the sixteenth title in the series, was released on July 21, 2022, for Microsoft Windows, PlayStation 4 and Nintendo Switch.

Mobile platforms
Game Boy
  (1990), loosely based on Nobunaga no Yabō and Nobunaga's Ambition II.

WonderSwan
  (1999)

Game Boy Color
  (1999), primarily based on Nobunaga's Ambition.

Game Boy Advance
  (2001), a remake of Nobunaga's Ambition: Lord of Darkness.

Nintendo DS
  (2006), a remake of Nobunaga no Yabō: Reppūden.
  (2008), containing board game elements.
  (2008), a remake of Nobunaga's Ambition: Lord of Darkness.
  (2012), a crossover with the Pokémon franchise.

Sony PlayStation Portable

  Nobunaga no Yabō: Tenshōki (信長の野望・天翔記, lit. Nobunaga's Ambition: Chronicles of the Ascension)
  Nobunaga no Yabō: Shōseiroku (信長の野望・将星録, lit. Nobunaga's Ambition: Records of the Star Generals)
  Nobunaga no Yabō: Reppūden (信長の野望・烈風伝, lit. Nobunaga's Ambition: Tales of the Storms)
  Nobunaga no Yabō: Ranseiki (信長の野望・嵐世記, lit. Nobunaga's Ambition: Chronicles of Turbulent Times)
  Nobunaga no Yabō: Sōtenroku (信長の野望・蒼天録, lit. Nobunaga's Ambition: Records of the Blue Skies)

Sony PlayStation Vita

These were released in Asia (in traditional Chinese versions), with physical copies for both versions with and without power up kit, on top of the Japanese versions released.

 Nobunaga's Ambition: Tendou (信長の野望・天道) (2012)
 Nobunaga's Ambition: Souzou / Nobunaga no Yabou: Souzou (信長の野望・創造) (2014)
 Nobunaga's Ambition: Sphere of Influence English version was seen on various websites such as on Play Asia, but not released.
 Nobunaga's Ambition: Souzou Sengoku Risshiden (信長の野望・創造 戦国立志伝) (2016)

Nintendo 3DS
  (2013)
  (2015)

Online games
  (1998), an online battle simulation game for Windows.
  (2003), an MMORPG for PlayStation 2, Windows, PlayStation 3 and PlayStation 4.
  (2003), a blanket title for a number of mobile phone games.
  (2010), a social network game by Mobage.
  (2011), a cat-themed browser-based online battle/raising simulation game.

Reception 
The Nobunaga's Ambition series has garnered several awards over the years. According to Koei's website, various releases in the series have won Log-In magazine's "BHS Prize", the "Minister of Post & Telecommunications Prize", Nikkei BP's 12th, 13th, and 14th annual "Best PC Software" awards, and CD-ROM Fan'''s "Fan of the Year 2001 Grand Prize".

In North America, where it was released five years after its Japanese release, critical reception was also positive. The game was positively reviewed by Computer Gaming World, where reviewer Evan Brooks gave it four stars out of five. He introduced the game as "a detailed economic / diplomatic / political / military simulation of the unification of Japan in the Sixteenth Century." He praised the graphics for being "among the best that this reviewer has ever seen for the IBM" and the 5x10 hex map battles, and noted that it used role-playing game elements, including assigning various statistics to a selected persona, a time system where each turn represents a year, as the daimyo ages and eventually dies of old age, and a multiplayer option. He stated that he "thoroughly enjoyed Nobunaga's Ambition", concluded with a "Highly Recommended" rating, Compute! similarly praised the IBM PC version, calling it "one of the best strategic war games ever designed for a personal computer" and citing the game play, user interface, and documentation. In the May 1990 edition of Games International, John Scott called this program "One of the best strategy games around." He gave the game a perfect rating of 10 out of 10 for game play.

The console versions had a more lukewarm reception. Reviewing the SNES version, GamePro praised the control interface and combat system but opined that the game essentially offers nothing to set it apart from Koei's previous historical simulators. The magazine rated the Genesis version similarly, saying that "Like all Koei games, Nobunaga has an easy-to-use but detailed menu-driven interface that activates a load of complex commands."

In 1996, Next Generation listed the series collectively as number 34 on their "Top 100 Games of All Time", commenting that, "Lead designer Shou Kibasawa is a tactical genius who realizes that domestic and military strategies are interconnected, and that fielding armies can only be accomplished after building an infrastructure to support them. As a result, Nobunaga's Ambition boasts a level of strategic complexity few other series can come close to matching."

See alsoBandit Kings of Ancient ChinaKessen III Gihren's Greed''

References

External links

Nobunaga's Ambition: Sphere of Influence official website  
Nobunaga's Ambition: Sphere of Influence – Ascension official website  

Works about Oda Nobunaga
Role-playing video games
Video game franchises introduced in 1983
Amiga games
DOS games
Game Boy games
Grand strategy video games
Classic Mac OS games
Koei games
Koei Tecmo franchises
MSX games
MSX2 games
Nintendo Entertainment System games
Video games about samurai
Sega Genesis games
Sengoku video games
Super Nintendo Entertainment System games
Nintendo Switch games
Turn-based strategy video games
Video games set in the 16th century
Video games set in feudal Japan
Virtual Console games
Virtual Console games for Wii U
Xbox 360 games
Video game franchises
Cultural depictions of Oda Nobunaga
Video games based on real people